Cycads  are seed plants that typically have a stout and woody (ligneous) trunk with a crown of large, hard, stiff, evergreen and (usually) pinnate leaves. The species are dioecious, that is, individual plants of a species are either male or female. Cycads vary in size from having trunks only a few centimeters to several meters tall. They typically grow very slowly and live very long. Because of their superficial resemblance, they are sometimes mistaken for palms or ferns, but they are not closely related to either group.

Cycads are gymnosperms (naked-seeded), meaning their unfertilized seeds are open to the air to be directly fertilized by pollination, as contrasted with angiosperms, which have enclosed seeds with more complex fertilization arrangements. Cycads have very specialized pollinators, usually a specific species of beetle. Both male and female cycads bear cones (strobili), somewhat similar to conifer cones.

Cycads have been reported to fix nitrogen in association with various cyanobacteria living in the roots (the "coralloid" roots). These photosynthetic bacteria produce a neurotoxin called BMAA that is found in the seeds of cycads. This neurotoxin may enter a  human food chain as the cycad seeds may be eaten directly as a source of flour by humans or by wild or feral animals such as bats, and humans may eat these animals. It is hypothesized that this is a source of some neurological diseases in humans. Another defence mechanism against herbivores is the accumulation of toxins in seeds and vegetative tissues; through horizontal gene transfer, cycads have acquired a family of genes from a microbial organism, most likely a fungus, which gives them the ability to produce an insecticidal toxin.

Cycads all over the world are in decline, with four species on the brink of extinction and seven species having fewer than 100 plants left in the wild.

Description 

Cycads have a cylindrical trunk which usually does not branch. However, some types of cycads, such as Cycas zeylanica, can branch their trunks. The apex of the stem is protected by modified leaves called cataphylls. Leaves grow directly from the trunk, and typically fall when older, leaving a crown of leaves at the top. The leaves grow in a rosette form, with new foliage emerging from the top and center of the crown. The trunk may be buried, so the leaves appear to be emerging from the ground, so the plant appears to be a basal rosette. The leaves are generally large in proportion to the trunk size, and sometimes even larger than the trunk.

The leaves are pinnate (in the form of bird feathers, pinnae), with a central leaf stalk from which parallel "ribs" emerge from each side of the stalk, perpendicular to it. The leaves are typically either compound (the leaf stalk has leaflets emerging from it as "ribs"), or have edges (margins) so deeply cut (incised) so as to appear compound. The Australian genus Bowenia and some Asian species of Cycas, like Cycas multipinnata, Cycas micholitzii and Cycas debaoensis, have leaves that are bipinnate, which means the leaflets each have their own subleaflets, growing in the same form on the leaflet as the leaflets grow on the stalk of the leaf (self-similar geometry).

Confusion with palms 
Due to superficial similarities in foliage and plant structure, cycads and palms are often mistaken for each other. They also can occur in similar climates. However, they belong to different phyla and as such are not closely related. The similar structure is the product of convergent evolution.

Beyond those superficial resemblances, there are a number of differences between cycads and palms. For one, both male and female cycads are gymnosperms and bear cones (strobili), while palms are angiosperms and so flower and bear fruit. The mature foliage looks very similar between both groups, but the young emerging leaves of a cycad resemble a fiddlehead fern before they unfold and take their place in the rosette, while the leaves of palms are just small versions of the mature frond. Another difference is in the stem. Both plants leave some scars on the stem below the rosette where there used to be leaves, but the scars of a cycad are helically arranged and small, while the scars of palms are a circle that wraps around the whole stem. The stems of cycads are also in general rougher and shorter than those of palms.

Taxonomy

The two extant families of cycads all belong to the order Cycadales, and are the Cycadaceae and Zamiaceae (including Stangeriaceae). These cycads have changed little since the Jurassic in comparison to some other plant divisions. Five additional families belonging to the Medullosales became extinct by the end of the Paleozoic Era.

Based on genetic studies, cycads are thought to be more closely related to Ginkgo than other living gymnosperms. Both are thought to have diverged from each other during the early Carboniferous.

Classification of the Cycadophyta to the rank of family.

 Class Cycadopsida Brongniart 1843
 Order Cycadales Persoon ex von Berchtold & Presl 1820
 Suborder Cycadineae Stevenson 1992
 Family Cycadaceae Persoon 1807
 Genus Cycas
 Suborder Zamiineae Stevenson 1992
 Family Zamiaceae Horaninow 1834
 subfamily Diooideae Pilg. 1926
 Genus Dioon
 subfamily Zamioideae Stevenson 1992
 Tribe Encephalarteae Miquel 1861
 Genus Macrozamia
 Genus Lepidozamia
 Genus Encephalartos
 Tribe Zamieae Miquel 1861
 Genus Bowenia
 Genus Ceratozamia
 Genus Stangeria
 Genus Zamia
 Genus Microcycas
Extinct cycad genera:

 Antarcticycas Middle Triassic, Antarctica (known from the whole plant)
 Ctenis Mesozoic-Paleogene, Worldwide (leaf form genus)
 Pseudoctenis (leaf form genus)

Fossil record

The oldest probable cycad foliage is known from the latest Carboniferous-Early Permian of South Korea and China. Unambiguous fossils of cycads are known from the Early-Middle Permian onwards. Cycads were generally uncommon during the Permian. Cycads reached their apex of diversity during the Mesozoic. Although the Mesozoic is sometimes called the "Age of Cycads," the foliage of cycads is very similar to other groups of extinct seed plants, such as Bennettitales and Nilssoniales, that are not closely related, and cycads were probably only a minor component of mid-Mesozoic floras, with Bennettitales and Nilsonniales being more abundant than cycads. The oldest records of the modern genus Cycas are from the Paleogene of East Asia. Fossils assignable to Zamiaceae are known from the Cretaceous, with fossils assignable to living genera of the family known from the Cenozoic.

Distribution

The living cycads are found across much of the subtropical and tropical parts of the world. The greatest diversity occurs in South and Central America. They are also found in Mexico, the Antilles, southeastern United States, Australia, Melanesia, Micronesia, Japan, China, Southeast Asia, Bangladesh, India, Sri Lanka, Madagascar, and southern and tropical Africa, where at least 65 species occur. Some can survive in harsh desert or semi-desert climates (xerophytic), others in wet rain forest conditions, and some in both. Some can grow in sand or even on rock, some in oxygen-poor, swampy, bog-like soils rich in organic material. Some are able to grow in full sun, some in full shade, and some in both. Some are salt tolerant (halophytes).

Species diversity of the extant cycads peaks at 17˚ 15"N and 28˚ 12"S, with a minor peak at the equator. There is therefore not a latitudinal diversity gradient towards the equator but towards the Tropic of Cancer and the Tropic of Capricorn. However, the peak near the northern tropic is largely due to Cycas in Asia and Zamia in the New World, whereas the peak near the southern tropic is due to Cycas again, and also to the diverse genus Encephalartos in southern and central Africa, and Macrozamia in Australia. Thus, the distribution pattern of cycad species with latitude appears to be an artifact of the geographical isolation of the remaining cycad genera and their species, and perhaps because they are partly xerophytic rather than simply tropical.

Cultural significance
In Vanuatu, the cycad is known as namele and is an important symbol of traditional culture. It serves as a powerful taboo sign, and a pair of namele leaves appears on the national flag and coat of arms. Together with the nanggaria plant, another symbol of Vanuatu culture, the namele also gives its name to Nagriamel, an indigenous political movement.

See also
Fossil Cycad National Monument, formerly in the U.S. state of South Dakota

Footnotes

References

External links

 Palm Trees, Small Palms, Cycads, Bromeliads and tropical plants site with thousands of large, high quality photos of cycads and associated flora. Includes information on habitat and cultivation.
Hill KD (1998–2004) The Cycad Pages, Royal Botanic Gardens Sydney. http://plantnet.rbgsyd.nsw.gov.au/PlantNet/cycad/index.html 
 Gymnosperm Database: Cycads
 Fairchild Tropical Botanic Garden- one of the largest collection of cycads in the world in Florida, U.S.A.
 Palm and Cycad Societies of Australia (PACSOA)
 The Cycad Society of South Africa
 Cycad nitrogen fixation
 Cycad toxicity
 The Cult of the Cycads, The New York Times Magazine article on cycad collectorship and cycad smuggling

 
Dioecious plants
Cisuralian first appearances
Extant Permian first appearances